David Murie (born August 21, 1976 in Edinburgh) is a former Scottish footballer

Career
Murie started his career through the youth teams at Scottish Premier League side Heart of Midlothian, playing as a full-back. Murie left the club at 23 to join Scottish Football League First Division side Greenock Morton, after making a dozen appearances in the SPL.

After leaving Morton in 2001, Murie dropped through the leagues with Berwick Rangers, Stenhousemuir and Brechin City, before ending up in the juniors with Newtongrange Star and now playing for Coldstream in the Scottish Borders

Outside of football
Married 
Murie works as a warden in the prison service.

External links

References

1976 births
Footballers from Edinburgh
Scottish footballers
Association football defenders
Greenock Morton F.C. players
Scottish Football League players
Living people
Scottish Junior Football Association players
Berwick Rangers F.C. players
Heart of Midlothian F.C. players
Brechin City F.C. players
Stenhousemuir F.C. players